Misheck Lungu (born 2 May 1980) is a Zambian footballer.

Club career
In 2009, Lungu joined Budapest Honvéd FC from Kecskeméti TE.

International career
Lungu was part of the Zambian 2002 and 2006 African Nations Cup teams, who finished third in group C in the first round of competition, thus failing to secure qualification for the quarter-finals.

References

1980 births
Living people
Zambian footballers
Nchanga Rangers F.C. players
Zambia international footballers
Green Buffaloes F.C. players
Zambian expatriate footballers
Lombard-Pápa TFC footballers
Expatriate footballers in Hungary
Zambian expatriate sportspeople in Angola
Kecskeméti TE players
Budapest Honvéd FC players
C.D. Primeiro de Agosto players
Expatriate footballers in Angola
2002 African Cup of Nations players
2006 Africa Cup of Nations players
Association football defenders
Sportspeople from Lusaka